LeanCMMI is an approach to software engineering process improvement that integrates agile computing methods with process design and deployment for organization's wishing to improve software engineering capability and achieve a maturity level two or three rating based upon the Software Engineering Institute's Capability Maturity Model Integration (CMMI).

Developed by Broadsword, LeanCMMI is based on Lean Engineering and the same concepts that spawned Extreme Programming (XP), Scrum, and Crystal, and traces its roots back to Edward Demings' "Theory of Profound Knowledge." Based upon the principle of "Just Enough Not Too Much," LeanCMMI maps the software process improvement journey across three major releases, each with seven iterations based on three "dimensions" of software process improvement each with equal weight and with equal importance to the success of the program.

Three Dimensions of Process Deployment 

Dimension 1: Design - Design and build the process along with all of its artifacts

Virtual teams develop a set of common, standard process deliverables that meet the requirements of their process area

Dimension 2: Communicate - Determine who received what message when

Virtual teams develop a strategy for communicating their work including identifying what message is delivered to each stakeholder group

Dimension 3: Educate - Determine who receives what training, at what level, at which time

Virtual teams develop training strategy and materials including identifying what level or training is delivered to each stakeholder group

Acceptance Test 

LeanCMMI uses a series of CMMI SCAMPI B and C Appraisals to be performed at the end of each Release in order to validate the contents of the Release and identify any gaps in the processes as it relates to the CMMI model.  This additive approach reduces risk and helps to ensure that a successful SCAMPI A Appraisal can be performed at the conclusion of the program.

Virtual Enduring Teams 

LeanCMMI requires an enduring virtual organization approach that levels the effort across all stakeholders with a five percent re-direct effort estimated for the duration of the program.  Organized into virtual teams called Special Interest Groups, or SIGs, these teams are Encapsulated Process Objects that own responsibility for the process, its data, maintenance, training, and communications.  An enduring virtual Software Engineering Process Group, or SEPG, serves as the Process Owner, and provides oversight, direction, and authority for the program.

Membership in the SIGs and SEPG is by opt-in and can rotate but the organizations endure as owners of the process.  This approach is designed to speed cultural adoption of the process by including as many practitioners as possible in the design and deployment phase.

References 

Software development process